Cimber Sterling A/S, also known as Cimber Air and styled as Cimber Sterling, was a Danish airline based in Sønderborg, Sønderborg Municipality, Denmark, operating scheduled domestic and international services in co-operation with Scandinavian Airlines (SAS) and Lufthansa. Its main bases were Copenhagen Airport and Billund Airport, with a smaller base at Aalborg Airport. The airline filed for bankruptcy on 3 May 2012.

History 

Cimber Air was founded in 1950 by Ingolf Lorenz Nielson who took over Sønderjyllands Flyveselskab.
Its first aircraft was a single engine SAI KZ III, call sign OY-DMO which had been used for flights primarily between Sønderborg and Copenhagen. In 1969 the airline took delivery of an eight-seat De Havilland Dove twin-engine light airliner.

Cimber Air was one of the very few operators of the VFW-Fokker 614 regional jet. It also operated Nord 262 and Grumman Gulfstream I turboprop aircraft on its scheduled services.

On 3 December 2008 Cimber Air bought parts of Sterling Airlines, which had filed for bankruptcy on 29 October 2008. The new airline, which was named Cimber-Sterling, was created on 7 January 2009. Cimber bought the AOC (Air Operators Certificate), slots, brand and website (www.sterling.com and other domains). Aircraft leases were negotiated with the owners. Employees of the former Sterling Airlines was not part of the takeover, but were welcome to seek employment in the new airline.

Cimber Sterling was originally wholly owned by Cimber Air Holding (Nielsen family) and had 368 employees (at March 2007).  It was listed on the Copenhagen Stock Exchange in 2009.  In 2011, due to financial difficulties Cimber Sterling entered into a subscription agreement with Mansvell Enterprises Ltd, which gave Ukrainian billionaire Ihor Kolomoyskyi a stake of 70.8%.

On the morning of 3 May 2012, Cimber Sterling cancelled all flights and declared bankruptcy.  Within hours, other airlines announced their entry on selected routes.

Cimber Sterling was the main sponsor of the Danish handball team in 2009 and 2010.

Destinations

Fleet 
The Cimber Sterling fleet included the following aircraft:

References

External links

www.cimber.com
www.cimber.dk 
www.cimber.se 
Cimber Group

Defunct airlines of Denmark
European Regions Airline Association
Airlines established in 1950
Airlines disestablished in 2012
Danish companies established in 1950
2012 disestablishments in Denmark